Kashif Mehmood (Punjabi) is a Pakistani television actor.

Television

Films
 Sultanat (2014)

Awards and nominations 
 2012 - Lux Style Awards - Best Television Actor-Terrestrial - Love, Life Aur Lahore

References

External links

Living people
Pakistani male television actors
Pakistani male film actors
Pakistani male stage actors
Punjabi people
Male actors from Lahore
People from Lahore
1975 births